The Kutschenberg is the highest hill in Brandenburg, Germany. It is part of the low hill range of the Kmehlener Berge and rises near Großkmehlen in the county of Oberspreewald-Lausitz.

Geography

Location 
The Kutschenberg is 2.5 km west-southwest of Ortrand and 1.5 kilometres south of Großkmehlen not far from the A 13 motorway to the west and within a small area of woodland in the Kmehlener Berge.

Height 
New surveys in 2000 discovered that the summit of the Kutschenberg was 201.0 m high and thus the highest hill in the state of Brandenburg. As a result, in 2011 a small granite stele was erected on its densely wooded summit that rises only slightly above its surroundings. The stele is inscribed with the words "KUTSCHENBERG 201 m ü. NHN".  Near the summit at 199.7 m is a trig point.

About 11 km to the west near Gröden is the Heidehöhe which, at 201.4 m, is slightly higher than the Kutschenberg, but is not the highest hill in Brandenburg, but its highest point, because the summit above it, the Heideberg, lies in Saxony. There is commonly held notion that the Hagelberg (200.24 m) on the Fläming Heath is the highest hill in Brandenburg, but the Kutschenberg is just a little higher.

Am Kutschenberg racetrack 
On the northeast hillside of the Kutschenberg about 400 metres from the summit is the nationally known offroad racetrack of Am Kutschenberg, where car and motorcycle races are regularly held.

Gallery

See also 
 List of hills of Brandenburg

References 

Hills of Brandenburg
Elbe-Elster Land